Goldville is a ghost town in the Eureka County, state of Nevada, in the United States.

History

Goldville District was founded by two prospectors in 1907. The mine they discovered became known as the Lynn Big Six Mine. During the first year of activities, the mine consisted of $21,000 worth of ore, which was later shipped to Salt Lake City.

In 1908, the mine's ore was depleted, causing the miners to leave. In 1912, the Lynn Big Six Mining Company reopened the Lynn Big Six Mine and soon started shipping ore to Salt Lake City once again.

A year later, a small camp and post office opened. Although the post office was closed in 1917, the mining company remained active. However, ore values began to decrease, and in 1939 all mining activities were shut down.

References

Ghost towns in Eureka County, Nevada
Ghost towns in Nevada
1907 establishments in Nevada
Populated places established in 1907